8 Cancri is a single, white-hued star in the zodiac constellation of Cancer. It has an apparent visual magnitude of +5.14, which indicates it is faintly visible to the naked eye under suitable viewing conditions. The distance to this star, as determined from its annual parallax shift of 15.20 mas, is around 215 light years. A radial velocity of +21 km/s indicates it is moving away from the Sun.

This is an A-type main-sequence star with a stellar classification of A1 V. It is a young star with an estimated age of just 144 million years, and has a high rate of spin with a projected rotational velocity of 173 km/s. 8 Cancri has 2.37 times the mass of the Sun and is radiating 36.6 times the Sun's luminosity from its photosphere at an effective temperature of around 10,352 K.

References

A-type main-sequence stars
Cancer (constellation)
Durchmusterung objects
Cancri, 08
066664
039567
3163